The 2012 ESPY Awards were announced from Nokia Theatre on July 11, 2012 and showed during the telecast on ESPN, July 11, 2012. ESPY Award is short for Excellence in Sports Performance Yearly Award.

Winners
Best Female Athlete: Brittney Griner, Basketball
Best Male Athlete: LeBron James, Basketball
Best Team: Miami Heat
Best Coach/Manager: Tom Coughlin, New York Giants
Best Comeback: Matthew Stafford
Best Game  -– San Francisco 49ers vs. New Orleans Saints
Best Moment -- Tim Tebow's 80-yard touchdown pass
Best Play -- Christian Watford's buzzer-beating shot to beat No. 1 Kentucky
Best Upset -—  Los Angeles Kings as the 8th seed winning the Stanley Cup
College Athletic Program -- Stanford women's athletics and Florida men's athletics
Best International Athlete -- Lionel Messi
Best Record-Breaking Performance -- Drew Brees, New Orleans Saints
Breakthrough Athlete of the Year -- Jeremy Lin, New York Knicks
Best Male Action Sports Athlete -- Shaun White, Skateboarding-Snowboarding
Best Female Action Sports Athlete -- Jamie Anderson, Snowboarding
Best Male Athlete with a Disability -- Kyle Maynard, Climbing
Best Female Athlete with a Disability -- Jessica Long, Swimming
Best Driver -- Tony Stewart
Fighter of the Year -- Floyd Mayweather Jr.
NBA Player of the Year -- LeBron James, Miami Heat
NFL Player of the Year -- Aaron Rodgers, Green Bay Packers
NHL Player of the Year -- Jonathan Quick, Los Angeles Kings
MLB Player of the Year -- Josh Hamilton, Texas Rangers
WNBA Player of the Year -- Diana Taurasi, Phoenix Mercury
Best Bowler -- Sean Rash
Best Female Golfer -- Cristie Kerr
Best Male Golfer -- Bubba Watson
Best Jockey -- Mario Gutierrez
Best MLS Player -- David Beckham, Los Angeles Galaxy
Best Male Tennis Player -- Novak Djokovic
Best Female Tennis Player -- Maria Sharapova

In Memoriam

Junior Seau
Dave Gavitt
Joe Paterno
Bubba Smith
Al Davis
Chester McGlockton
Myra Kraft
Orlando Woolridge
Gary Carter
Mike Flanagan
Moose Skowron
Giorgio Chinaglia
Don Carter
Pavol Demitra
Joe Frazier
Sócrates
Angelo Dundee
Alketas Panagoulias
Bert Sugar
Sarah Burke
Dan Wheldon

External links
ESPY Winners

2012
ESPY
ESPY
ESPY
ESPY